The Tanganyika African Association (TAA) was a Tanganyika Territory political association, formed in 1929. It was founded by civil servants including Ali Saidi, members of an earlier association called the Tanganyika Territory African Civil Service Association (founded by Martin Kayamba in 1922). After World War II, TAA expanded countrywide in towns and in rural areas, and in 1948, the number of branches had increased to 39. It was transformed into the Tanganyika African National Union (TANU) in 1954 by Julius Nyerere.

References

Chama Cha Mapinduzi
1929 establishments in Tanganyika
Political parties established in 1929
Organisations based in Tanzania
Tanganyika (territory)
Politics of Tanganyika
African and Black nationalist organizations in Africa